"Go Outside in the Rain" is a R&B song by Milira released on November 21, 1990. The track is from her debut album, Milira, and reached number thirty-six on Billboard's Hot R&B Singles chart.

Track listing
US 12" Promo

Charts

References

1990 songs
Milira songs
1991 singles
Motown singles